John David Kasay (born October 27, 1969) is a former American football kicker who played in the National Football League (NFL) for 21 seasons, primarily with the Carolina Panthers. He played college football at Georgia and was selected by the Seattle Seahawks in the fourth round of the 1991 NFL Draft. Kasay left the Seahawks in 1995 to sign with the expansion Panthers, whom he was a member of for 16 seasons. He became the Panthers' all-time leading scorer, while also earning Pro Bowl honors during the 1996 season and making a Super Bowl appearance in Super Bowl XXXVIII. Retiring after one season with the New Orleans Saints, Kasay was the last remaining player from the inaugural Panthers team.

High school years
Kasay attended Clarke Central High School in Athens, Georgia, where he was a soccer standout and football kicker/punter. He was an all-state selection with 37 career field goals, including a 54-yarder.

College and pro career
Kasay was a four-year letterman at the University of Georgia. He finished his college career fifth on the school's career kick scoring list with 217 points, converting 46-of-65 field goals and 79-of-82 extra points. Kasay graduated from Georgia in 1991 with a degree in journalism.

Kasay was drafted in the fourth round in 1991 by the Seattle Seahawks. During his tenure, he led the Seahawks in scoring all four years, and left the team with the highest field goal percentage in team history. The Panthers signed him as a free agent prior to the team's debut in the 1995 season. He played for the Panthers in 15 seasons, but missed the whole 2000 season after breaking his left kneecap in August.

Super Bowl XXXVIII was bittersweet for Kasay. Although he converted a 50-yard field goal and made both extra points, his final kickoff went out of bounds, incurring an illegal procedure penalty that placed the ball on the 40. This assisted the New England Patriots on their drive that resulted in the game winning field goal.

Kasay continued to play for the Panthers through the 2010 season. On July 28, 2011, he was released by Carolina after they signed Olindo Mare. He was the last remaining player left from the Panthers' 1995 inaugural season and the last NFL player born in the 1960s to retire.

The New Orleans Saints signed Kasay on August 30, 2011, after an injury to their starting kicker Garrett Hartley during a preseason game. According to Al Michaels during the Thursday Night Football broadcast against the Green Bay Packers on September 8, 2011, Kasay was at a "back-to-school" event when he received a phone call from the Saints wishing to sign him. Kasay played out the 2011 season in New Orleans, and was re-signed through the 2012 NFL season by Saints on April 26, 2012. However, he was released by the Saints on August 31, 2012, with the return of Hartley.

On May 7, 2013, the Panthers announced that Kasay would sign a one-day contract and retire as a Panther. The Panthers held a press conference at Bank of America Stadium that day to honor Kasay; team owner Jerry Richardson introduced Kasay, and many players, as well as the Richardson family, attended the event. Kasay became eligible for induction in the team's Ring of Honor five years after his retirement.

Career regular season statistics
Career high/best bolded

Awards and records
Kasay formerly held the record for most field goals in a single season with 37 in 1996, and he was awarded a Pro Bowl appearance as a result. This has been surpassed by Olindo Mare (39 in 1999), Neil Rackers (42 in 2005), and David Akers (44 in 2011).

Kasay also holds many NFL records as a placekicker. He is second all-time for field goals made from 50+ yards (42) made behind only Jason Hanson (50) and is the only player to convert on four field goals from 46+ yards in a single game.

Kasay hit his 400th field goal on December 6, 2009, in a game against the Tampa Bay Buccaneers. He is only the 7th player in NFL history to accomplish that. Kasay is the longest tenured player to play for the Panthers.

's NFL off-season, John Kasay held at least 9 Panthers franchise records, including:
 Extra Points: career (429), game (5 on 2006-01-01 @ATL; with Richie Cunningham and Graham Gano), playoffs (18)
 Field Goals: career (351), season (37 in 1996), game (6 on 2004-12-05 @NOR), playoffs (21), playoff season (9 in 2003), playoff game (5 on 2004-01-03 DAL)
 Points: as of September 8, 2017 he is the all-time scoring leader for the Carolina Panthers with 1,482 points.

Personal life
Kasay is married with two sons and two daughters  and is a Christian. He served as the athletic director for the Charlotte Christian School after retiring from football and is working to publish a biography.

References

External links

 Current statistics
 Biography on Panthers.com
 

1969 births
Living people
American football placekickers
Georgia Bulldogs football players
Carolina Panthers players
Seattle Seahawks players
National Conference Pro Bowl players
Players of American football from Georgia (U.S. state)
Sportspeople from Athens, Georgia
New Orleans Saints players